Phyllonorycter juglandicola is a moth of the family Gracillariidae. It is known from Kazakhstan, Kyrgyzstan and Tajikistan.

The larvae feed on Juglans regia. They probably mine the leaves of their host plant.

References

juglandicola
Moths of Asia
Moths described in 1975